Dr. Sarvepalli Radhakrishnan Rajasthan Ayurved University, formerly Rajasthan Ayurved University, is Ayurved university in the state Rajasthan. The university situated in Jodhpur was founded on 24 May 2003.

This university affiliates about 42 colleges/institutions of Ayurved, Unani, Homeopathy. University conducts Joint Entrance Test for the admission into its various degree program. The university's constituent colleges includes Ayurved college, Homoeopathic Colleges, Unani Colleges, Yoga and Naturopathy Colleges. Abhimanyu kumar was appointed vice chancellor in 2019.

Ayurvedic medicine and homeopathy are considered pseudoscientific because their premises are not based on science.

See also
Arid Forest Research Institute (AFRI) Jodhpur

References

External links
 

Ayurvedic colleges in Rajasthan
Universities in Jodhpur
Educational institutions established in 2003
2003 establishments in Rajasthan